The 1994 United States Senate election in Wyoming was held November 3, 1994. Incumbent Republican U.S. Senator Malcolm Wallop decided to retire instead of seeking a fourth term. Republican U.S. Representative Craig L. Thomas won the open seat, defeating Democratic Governor Mike Sullivan.

Major candidates

Democratic 
 Mike Sullivan, Governor of Wyoming

Republican 
 Craig L. Thomas, U.S. Representative

Results

See also 
 1994 United States Senate elections

References 

1994 Wyoming elections
Wyoming
1994